Arbakka is an unincorporated community in the Rural Municipality of Stuartburn, Manitoba, lying south of Vita, Manitoba. This region is sparsely populated, and its major exports are farmed goods and hogs.

References 

Unincorporated communities in Eastman Region, Manitoba